The Acalyptratae or Acalyptrata are a subsection of the Schizophora, which are a section of the order Diptera, the "true flies". In various contexts the Acalyptratae also are referred to informally as the acalyptrate muscoids, or acalyptrates, as opposed to the Calyptratae. All forms of the name refer to the lack of calypters in the members of this subsection of flies. An alternative name, Acalypterae is current, though in minority usage. It was first used by Pierre-Justin-Marie Macquart in 1835 for a section of his tribe Muscides; he used it to refer to all acalyptrates plus scathophagids and phorids, but excluding Conopidae.

The confusing forms of the names stem from their first usage; Acalyptratae and Acalyptrata actually are adjectival forms in New Latin. They were coined in the mid 19th century in contexts such as "Muscae Calyptratae and Acalyptratae" and "Diptera Acalyptrata", and the forms stuck.

The Acalyptratae are a large assemblage, exhibiting very diverse habits, with one notable and perhaps surprising exception: no known acalyptrates are obligate blood-feeders (hematophagous), though blood feeding at various stages of the life history is common throughout other Dipteran sections.

Classification
The classification of the Acalyptratae has varied over time, and the below list is likely to change in future.
Subsection Acalyptratae
Superfamily Conopoidea
Conopidae
Superfamily Tephritoidea
Ctenostylidae
Eurygnathomyiidae
Lonchaeidae
Pallopteridae
Piophilidae
Platystomatidae
Pyrgotidae
Richardiidae
Tephritidae (including Tachiniscidae)
Ulidiidae
Superfamily Nerioidea
Cypselosomatidae
Fergusoninidae
Micropezidae
Neriidae
Pseudopomyzidae
Strongylophthalmyiidae
Tanypezidae
Superfamily Diopsoidea
Diopsidae
Gobryidae
Megamerinidae
Nothybidae
Psilidae
Somatiidae
Syringogastridae
Superfamily Sciomyzoidea
Coelopidae
Dryomyzidae
Helcomyzidae
Helosciomyzidae
Heterocheilidae
Ropalomeridae
Sepsidae
Sciomyzidae (including Huttoninidae and Phaeomyiidae)
Superfamily Sphaeroceroidea
Chyromyidae
Heleomyzidae
Heteromyzidae (disputed)
Nannodastiidae
Sphaeroceridae
Superfamily Lauxanioidea
Celyphidae
Chamaemyiidae
Lauxaniidae
Superfamily Opomyzoidea
Agromyzidae
Anthomyzidae
Asteiidae
Aulacigastridae
Clusiidae
Marginidae
Neminidae
Neurochaetidae
Odiniidae
Opomyzidae
Periscelididae
Teratomyzidae
Xenasteiidae
Superfamily Ephydroidea
Camillidae
Curtonotidae
Diastatidae
Drosophilidae
Ephydridae
Mormotomyiidae
Superfamily Carnoidea
Acartophthalmidae
Australimyzidae
Braulidae
Canacidae
Carnidae
Chloropidae
Cryptochetidae
Inbiomyiidae
Milichiidae
Acalyptratae incertae sedis
Paraleucopidae

References

External links